The 2020–21 Syracuse Orange men's basketball team represented Syracuse University during the 2020–21 NCAA Division I men's basketball season. The Orange were led by 45th-year head coach Jim Boeheim and played their home games at the Carrier Dome in Syracuse, New York as eighth-year members of the Atlantic Coast Conference.

The Orange finished the season 18–10, 9–7 in ACC play, to finish in eight place.  In the ACC tournament, they defeated NC State in the second round before losing to Virginia in the Quarterfianls.  They received an at-large bid to the NCAA tournament as an eleven seed in the Midwest Region.  In the tournament, they defeated six seed San Diego State in the first round and three seed West Virginia in the second round, before losing to two seed Houston in the Sweet Sixteen.

Previous season
The Orange finished the 2019–20 season 18–14, 10–10 in ACC play to finish in a tie for sixth place. They defeated North Carolina in the second round of the 2020 ACC tournament and was scheduled to play Louisville in the quarterfinals before the tournament was cancelled due to the COVID-19 pandemic.  The NCAA tournament and NIT were also cancelled due to the pandemic.

Offseason

Departures

Incoming transfers

2020 recruiting class

Roster

Schedule and results

Source:

|-
!colspan=9 style=| Regular season

|-
!colspan=12 style=| ACC tournament

|-
!colspan=12 style=| NCAA tournament

Rankings

*AP does not release post-NCAA Tournament rankings^Coaches did not release a Week 2 poll.

References

Syracuse Orange men's basketball seasons
Syracuse
Syracuse basketball, men
Syracuse basketball, men
Syracuse